In mathematics,  S2S is the monadic second order theory of the infinite complete binary tree.

S2S  may also refer to:
 Server-to-server, protocol exchange between servers
 Site-to-site VPN
 S2S Pte Ltd, a Japanese record label
 Ski to Sea Race, a race in Whatcom County, Washington
 Sister2Sister, Christine and Sharon Muscat, Maltese-Australian singers
 Sales to Support, type of transfer on Call Center lines, Sales to Technical Support Transfer
 In woodworking or lumber terms S2S= surfaced two sides, while S3S = surfaced three sides and s4s = surfaced four sides